Joseph Laughlin ("Lachie") Stewart (born 22 June 1943 in Vale of Leven, West Dunbartonshire) is a Scottish former distance runner, and an inductee in the Scottish Sports Hall of Fame.

Stewart's athletic career saw him compete at the 1970 Commonwealth Games in Edinburgh, where he won Gold in the 10,000 metres over Ron Clarke of Australia, and the 1972 Summer Olympics in Munich.

External links
 Stewart wins gold (video) 
  Lachie Stewart – British Olympic Assoc
  Lachie Stewart wins gold medal
  Athletics: New age of the Stewarts
  Lachie Stewart enters Sport's Hall of Fame

1943 births
Living people
Scottish male long-distance runners
Athletes (track and field) at the 1970 British Commonwealth Games
Athletes (track and field) at the 1972 Summer Olympics
Commonwealth Games gold medallists for Scotland
Commonwealth Games medallists in athletics
Olympic athletes of Great Britain
Medallists at the 1970 British Commonwealth Games